The following is a list of notable current and past news anchors, correspondents, hosts, regular contributors and meteorologists from the CNN, CNN International and HLN news networks.

Executives
 Ken Jautz — Executive Vice President of CNN, responsible for CNN/US
 Amy Entelis — Executive Vice President for talent and content development of CNN Worldwide
 Rachel Smolkin — Vice President and Executive Editor of CNN Politics

Former executives
 Allison Gollust – chief marketing officer of CNN Worldwide
 Tony Maddox – Executive Vice President and Managing Director of CNN International
 Andrew Morse – Executive Vice President & General Manager of CNN Digital Worldwide
 John Stankey – CEO, WarnerMedia
 Jeff Zucker – President of CNN Worldwide

Hosts & Anchors

Weekdays
 John Berman 
 Victor Blackwell — CNN Newsroom (with Alisyn Camerota)
 Wolf Blitzer — The Situation Room with Wolf Blitzer
 Kate Bolduan — At This Hour with Kate Bolduan
 Erin Burnett — Erin Burnett OutFront
 Alisyn Camerota — CNN Newsroom (with Victor Blackwell) 
 Laura Coates — CNN Tonight
 Kaitlan Collins — CNN This Morning (with Don Lemon and Poppy Harlow)
 Anderson Cooper — Anderson Cooper 360°
 Poppy Harlow — CNN This Morning (with Don Lemon and Kaitlan Collins)
 Erica Hill — CNN Newsroom (with Jim Sciutto) (Erica is a temporary replacement for Poppy Harlow)
 Brianna Keilar
 John King — Inside Politics (weekday edition)
 Don Lemon — CNN This Morning (with Poppy Harlow and Kaitlan Collins)
 Christine Romans — Early Start (with Laura Jarrett)
 Jim Sciutto — CNN Newsroom (with Erica Hill; temporary replacement for Poppy Harlow)
 Jake Tapper — The Lead with Jake Tapper

Weekends
Saturdays & Sundays
 Jim Acosta – CNN Newsroom
 Pamela Brown – CNN Newsroom
 Amara Walker – CNN This Morning Weekend (with Boris Sanchez)
 Fredricka Whitfield — CNN NewsroomSaturdays
 Michael Smerconish — SmerconishSundays
 Dana Bash – State of the Union with Dana Bash (alternating with Jake Tapper)
 Abby Phillip - Inside Politics (weekend edition)
 Jake Tapper — State of the Union with Jake Tapper (alternating with Dana Bash)
 Chris Wallace – Who's Talking to Chris Wallace Fareed Zakaria — Fareed Zakaria GPSCNN International
 Christiane Amanpour — Amanpour (Chief International Anchor)
 Paolo Abrera — CNN Philippines New Day (CNN Philippines)
 Becky Anderson — Connect the World (CNN Abu Dhabi)
 Guillermo Arduino — Encuentro (CNN en Español)
 Zain Asher — One World with Zain Asher Kim Brunhuber — CNN Newsroom (Europe morning Editions)

Current personalities

 Paolo Abrera (CNN Philippines)
 Jim Acosta (CNN)
 Jane Akre (CNN)
 Christiane Amanpour (CNN International)
 Shahira Amin (CNN International)
 David A. Andelman (CNN)
 Becky Anderson (CNN International)
 Desi Anwar (CNN Indonesia)
 Zain Asher (CNN)
 John Avlon (CNN)
 David Axelrod (CNN)
 Robert Baer (CNN)
 Dana Bash (CNN)
 Paul Begala (CNN)
 Katie Benner (CNN)
 Peter Bergen (CNN/CNN International)
 John Berman (CNN)
 Carl Bernstein (CNN)
 Nadia Bilchik (CNN/CNN International)
 Joan Biskupic (CNN)
 Jim Bittermann (CNN International)
 Phil Black (CNN/CNN International)
 Victor Blackwell (CNN)
 Derek Blasberg (CNN International)
 Wolf Blitzer (CNN)
 Kate Bolduan (CNN)
 Max Boot (CNN)
 Gloria Borger (CNN)
 Andrew Brown (CNN)
 Pamela Brown (CNN)
 Ron Brownstein (CNN)
 Kim Brunhuber (CNN/CNN International)
 Frank Bruni (CNN)
 Isabel Bucaram (CNN en Español)
 Samuel Burke (CNN & CNN en Español)
 Erin Burnett (CNN)
 Diego Bustos (CNN en Español)
 Dylan Byers (CNN)
 Alisyn Camerota (CNN)
 Maria Cardona (CNN/CNN en Espanol)
 Amanda Carpenter (CNN)
 Jason Carroll (CNN)
 Jean Casarez (CNN/HLN)
 David Chalian (CNN)
 Matthew Chance (CNN/CNN International)
 Lanhee Chen (CNN)
 Rosemary Church (CNN International)
 Chris Cillizza (CNN)
 Laura Coates (CNN)
 Elizabeth Cohen (CNN)
 Kaitlan Collins (CNN)
 Shanon Cook (CNN/CNN International)
 Anderson Cooper (CNN; also at CBS News)
 Anna Coren (CNN International)
 Ahmet Hakan Coskun (CNNTurk)
 Roger Cossack (CNN)
 Adrianna Costa (CNN)
 Philippe Cousteau, Jr. (CNN International)
 Catherine Crier (CNN)
 S. E. Cupp (CNN)
 Stephanie Cutter
 Daniel Dale (CNN)
 Amanda Davies (CNN International)
 Andy Dean (CNN)
 John Defterios (CNN International)
 Jeremy Diamond (CNN)
 Kimberly Dozier (CNN)
 Nima Elbagir (CNN International)
 Mo Elleithee (CNN)
 Harry Enten (CNN)
 David Fahrenthold (CNN)
 Brian Fallon (CNN)
 Ben Ferguson (CNN)
 Karen Finney (CNN)
 Ari Fleischer (CNN)
 Tom Foreman (CNN)
 Max Foster (CNN International)
 Sandi Freeman (CNN)
 Gabriela Frias (CNN en Español)
 David Frum (CNN)
 Tom Fuentes (CNN)
 Delia Gallagher (CNN)
 Scott Galloway (professor) (CNN+)
 Rico Hizon (CNN Philippines)
 Jamie Gangel (CNN)
 Sara Ganim (CNN/HLN)
 David Gergen (CNN)
 Alexis Glick (CNN)
 Hadas Gold (CNN)
 Bianna Golodryga (CNN)
 David L. Grange (CNN/CNN International)
 David Gregory (CNN)
 Sanjay Gupta (CNN)
 Maggie Haberman (CNN)
 Paula Hancocks (CNN/CNN International)
 Poppy Harlow (CNN)
 Jenny Harrison (CNN International)
 Nia-Malika Henderson (CNN)
 Mark Hertling (CNN)
 Fred Hickman (CNN)
 E. D. Hill (CNN)
 Erica Hill (CNN)
 John Holliman (CNN)
 Jessica Holmes (CNN)
 Michael Holmes (CNN/CNN International)
 Pia Hontiveros (CNN Philippines)
 Margaret Hoover (CNN)
 Scottie Nell Hughes (CNN)
 Kasie Hunt (CNN)
 Steve Israel (CNN/CNN International)
 Christine Jacob (CNN Philippines)
 Patricia Janiot (CNN en Español)
 Pedram Javaheri (CNN International)
 Omar Jimenez (CNN)
 Joe Johns (CNN)
 Doug Jones (CNN)
 Van Jones (CNN)
 Nefise Karatay (CNNTurk)
 Randi Kaye (CNN)
 Brianna Keilar (CNN)
 Donna Kelley (CNN)
 Joe Kennedy III (CNN)
 John King (CNN)
 Sally Kohn (CNN)
 Tal Kopan (CNN)
 Alison Kosik (CNN) 
 Michelle Kosinski (CNN)
 Nicholas Kristof (CNN)
 Jackie Kucinich (CNN)
 Kyung Lah (CNN International)
 Don Lemon (CNN)
 Josh Levs (CNN)
 Matt Lewis (CNN)
 Oren Liebermann (CNN International)
 Katie Linendoll (CNN)
 Ryan Lizza (CNN)
 Errol Louis (CNN)
 Mia Love (CNN)
 Kevin Madden (CNN)
 Suzanne Malveaux (CNN)
 Menchu Macapagal (CNN Philippines)
 Jonathan Mann (CNN International)
 Miguel Marquez (CNN)
 Cathy Marshall (CNN)
 Lola Martinez (CNN International)
 Chloe Melas (CNN)
 Jim Miklaszewski (CNN)
 Stephen Moore (CNN)
 Jeanne Moos (CNN)
 Sara Murray (CNN)
 Chad Myers (CNN)
 Tim Naftali (CNN)
 Asieh Namdar (CNN International)
 Ana Navarro (CNN), (CNN en Español)
 Paula Newton (CNN/CNN International)
 Ryan Nobles (CNN)
 Robin Oakley (CNN International)
 Miles O'Brien (CNN)
 Donie O'Sullivan (CNN)
 Toluse Olorunnipa (CNN)
 Alejandra Gutierrez Oraa (CNN en Español)
 Elizabeth Perez (CNN/CNN en Español/CNN International)
 Dan Pfeiffer (CNN)
 Abby Phillip (CNN)
 Katrina Pierson (CNN)
 Pedro Pinto (CNN International)
 Frederik Pleitgen (CNN International)
 Kirsten Powers (CNN)
 Bill Press (CNN)
 Mark Preston (CNN/CNN International)
 Shimon Prokupecz (CNN/CNN International)
 Richard Quest (CNN International)
 Manu Raju (CNN)
 Aneesh Raman (CNN)
 Charles H. Ramsey (CNN)
 Anjali Rao (CNN International)
 Paula Reid (CNN)
 David Remnick (CNN)
 Emily Reuben (CNN International)
 Naibe Reynoso (CNN en Español)
 Don Riddell (CNN International)
 Sasha Rionda (CNN en Español)
 Nic Robertson (CNN/CNN International)
 Shirley Robertson (CNN International)
 Jennifer Rodgers (CNN)
 Mai Rodriguez (CNN Philippines)
 Mike Rogers (CNN)
 David S. Rohde (CNN)
 Christine Romans (CNN)
 Susan Rook (CNN)
 Hilary Rosen (CNN)
 Richard Roth (CNN International)
 Ted Rowlands (CNN)
 Angela Rye (CNN)
 Ines Sainz (CNN en Español)
 Martin Savidge (CNN/HLN/CNN International)
 Jim Sciutto (CNN)
 Laurie Segall (CNN)
 Bakari Sellers (CNN)
 Andrew Serwer (CNN)
 Tara Setmayer (CNN)
 Atika Shubert (CNN International)
 Sara Sidner (CNN)
 Michael Smerconish (CNN)
 Rachel Smolkin (CNN)
 Kristie Lu Stout (CNN International)
 David Swerdlick (CNN)
 Sherri Sylvester (CNN)
 Jake Tapper (CNN)
 Fran Townsend (CNN)
 Gary Tuchman (CNN)
 Nina Turner (CNN)
 Bill Tush (CNN)
 John Vause (CNN International)
 Zain Verjee (CNN International)
 Geovanny Vicente (CNN en Español)
 Samantha Vinograd (CNN)
 Amara Walker (CNN International)
 Kelly Wallace (CNN)
 Nick Paton Walsh (CNN International)
 Clarissa Ward (CNN/CNN International)
 Jeff Weaver (CNN)
 Pinky Webb (CNN Philippines)
 Ben Wedeman (CNN International)
 Michael Weiss (CNN)
 Fredricka Whitfield (CNN)
 Coy Wire (HLN/CNN)
 Fareed Zakaria (CNN)
 Jeff Zeleny (CNN)
 Julian E. Zelizer (CNN)

Series and specials hosts
 Reza Aslan — Believer W. Kamau Bell — United Shades of America Anderson Cooper — CNN Heroes Van Jones — The Messy Truth with Van Jones Mark Konkol — Chicagoland Lisa Ling — This Is Life with Lisa Ling Mike Rogers — Declassified: Untold Stories of American Spies Mike Rowe — Somebody's Gotta Do It Nicki Shields — Saved by the Future Kevin Spacey — Race for the White House Morgan Spurlock — Morgan Spurlock Inside Man Meryl Streep — We Will Rise Stanley Tucci - Searching for Italy John Walsh — The Hunt with John Walsh Bill Weir — The Wonder List with Bill Weir Robin Wright - First Ladies Fareed Zakaria — The Most Powerful Man in the WorldPolitical and legal analysts

 Jim Acosta — Chief Domestic Correspondent
 Dana Bash — Chief Political Correspondent
 Richard Ben-Veniste — Legal Analyst
 Carl Bernstein — Political Analyst
 Wolf Blitzer — CNN Lead Political Anchor
 Gloria Borger — Chief Political Analyst
 Pamela Brown — Senior Washington Correspondent
 David Chalian — Senior Political Analyst; CNN Political Director
 Laura Coates — Legal Analyst
 Kaitlan Collins — Chief Correspondent 
 John Dean — Senior Political Contributor
 Jeremy Diamond — White House Correspondent
 Harry Enten — Political Analyst and Senior Writer
 Jamie Gangel — CNN Special Correspondent
 David Gergen — Senior Political Analyst
 David Gregory — Political Analyst
 Maggie Haberman — Political Analyst
 Joe Johns — Senior Washington Correspondent
 Brianna Keilar — Senior Washington Correspondent
 John King — Chief National Correspondent
 MJ Lee — Senior White House Correspondent
 Ryan Lizza — Political Analyst
 Wesley Lowery — Political Contributor 
 Suzanne Malveaux — National Correspondent
 Ryan Nobles — Congressional Correspondent
 Abby Phillip — Senior Political Correspondent
 Mark Preston — Senior Political Analyst; Executive Editor, CNN Politics Manu Raju — Chief Congressional Correspondent
 Josh Rogin — Political Analyst
 Sara Sidner — Senior National Correspondent
 Jake Tapper — Chief Washington Correspondent
 Geovanny Vicente — Political Analyst
 Samantha Vinograd — National Security Analyst 
 Jeff Zeleny — Chief National Affairs Correspondent

Political contributors

 Ashley Allison
 John Avlon
 David Axelrod
 Paul Begala
 Peter Beinart
 Keith Boykin
 Maria Cardona
 Amanda Carpenter
 S. E. Cupp
 Abdul El-Sayed
 Brian Fallon
 Ben Ferguson
 David Frum
 LZ Granderson
 Jennifer Granholm
 Mary Katharine Ham
 Margaret Hoover
 Steve Israel
 Van Jones
 Jason Kander
 Sally Kohn
 Matt K. Lewis
 Mia Love
 Kevin Madden
 Jason Miller
 Timothy Naftali
 Ana Navarro
 Kirsten Powers
 Bill Press
 Christine Quinn
 Catherine Rampell
 Hilary Rosen
 Angela Rye
 Symone Sanders
 Tara Setmayer
 Bakari Sellers
 David Swerdlick
 David Urban
 J. D. Vance
 Geovanny Vicente
 Andrew Yang
 Julian E. Zelizer

Security and foreign policy analysts

 Christiane Amanpour — Chief International Anchor
 Robert Baer — Intelligence and Security Analyst
 Peter Bergen — Chief National Security Analyst
 Tony Blinken — Global Affairs Analyst
 Matthew Chance — Senior International Correspondent 
 James Clapper — National Security Analyst
 Arwa Damon — Senior International Correspondent
 Rick Francona — Military Analyst
 Michael Hayden — National Security Analyst
 Mark Hertling — Military and Defense Analyst
 Juliette Kayyem — National Security Analyst
 John Kirby — Military and Diplomatic Analyst
 Michelle Kosinski — Senior Diplomatic Correspondent
 Aaron David Miller — Global Affairs Analyst
 Lisa Monaco — Senior National Security Analyst
 Nic Robertson — International Diplomatic Editor
 Mike Rogers — National Security Commentator
 David Rohde — Global Affairs Analyst
 Jim Sciutto — Chief National Security Correspondent
 Barbara Starr — Senior Pentagon Correspondent 
 Clarissa Ward — Chief International Correspondent
 Michael Weiss — National Security Analyst
 Joseph Yun — Global Affairs Analyst
 Fareed Zakaria — Foreign Policy Analyst

Former personalities

 Natalie Allen (CNN/CNN International)
 Roz Abrams
 Brooke Alexander
 Serena Altschul
 Brooke Anderson
 Kelli Arena
 Peter Arnett
 Sharyl Attkisson
 Terry Baddoo
 Rudi Bakhtiar (CNN)
 Brooke Baldwin
 Ashleigh Banfield (HLN)
 Errol Barnett
 Bobbie Battista
 André Bauer
 Willow Bay
 Bob Beckel
 Ralph Begleiter
 Joy Behar
 Todd Benjamin
 Steve Berthiaume
 Mike Boettcher
 Michelle Bonner
 Anthony Bourdain — Parts Unknown Donna Brazile
 Andrew Breitbart
 Dave Briggs (CNN) 
 Mike Brooks (HLN)
 Aaron Brown
 Campbell Brown
 Richard Brown 
 Pat Buchanan
 Ana Cabrera
 Jack Cafferty
 Catherine Callaway (CNN/HLN)
 Susan Candiotti
 Richelle Carey
 Margaret Carlson
 Tucker Carlson
 James Carville
 Stan Case
 Helen Casey
 Bob Cain
 Claire Celdran (CNN Philippines)
 Virginia Cha
 Emily Chang
 Mona Charen
 Nick Charles
 Joie Chen
 Allan Chernoff
 Kiran Chetry
 Sophia Choi
 Brian Christie
 Connie Chung
 Jim Clancy
 Leesa Clark
 Stephen Cole
 Heidi Collins
 Kellyanne Conway
 Roger Cossack
 Carol Costello (HLN)
 Katie Couric 
 Candy Crowley
 Chris Cuomo (CNN)
 Robyn Curnow (CNN International)
 Natasha Curry
 Arwa Damon (CNN/CNN International)
 Laurie Dhue
 Denise Dillon
 Seth Doane
 Lou Dobbs
 Jill Dougherty
 Ayesha Durgahee
 Bud Elliott
 Rowland Evans
 Marc Fein
 Geraldine Ferraro
 Deborah Feyerick (CNN)
 Elizabeth Filippouli
 Adrian Finighan
 Peter Ford
 Judy Fortin
 David French
 Mike Galanos (HLN)
 Lori Geary
 Courtney George
 Mark Geragos
 Kate Giles
 David Goodnow
 Hala Gorani (CNN International)
 Nancy Grace
 Jennifer Granholm (CNN)
 Nick Gregory
 Drew Griffin (CNN; deceased)
 Kimberly Guilfoyle
 AJ Hammer (HLN)
 Leon Harris
 Tony Harris
 Don Harrison
 Lois Hart
 Pat Harvey
 Leon Hawthorne
 Bill Hemmer
 Kara Henderson
 Susan Hendricks (CNN/HLN)
 Ed Henry
 Nicolette Henson-Hizon
 Fred Hickman
 Stella Inger (HLN)
 Marc Lamont Hill
 John Holliman
 T. J. Holmes
 George Howell
 Eileen Hsieh
 Jim Huber
 Jeff Hullinger
 Al Hunt
 Steve Hurst
 Micah Johnson
 Phil Jones
 Daryn Kagan
 Jerrold Kessel
 Riz Khan
 Jodie Kidd (CNN International)
 Larry King
 Jack Kingston
 Michael Kinsley
 Elsa Klensch
 Jeff Koinange
 Andrea Koppel
 Sachi Koto
 Michelle Kosinski
 Amanda Lang
 Nicole Lapin
 Denise LeClair Cobb (HLN)
 Ian James Lee (CNN International)
 May Lee
 Corey Lewandowski
 Carol Lin
 Dana Loesch (CNN)
 Melissa Long
 Stuart H. Loory
 Jeffrey Lord
 Bob Losure
 Richard Lui
 Tumi Makgabo
 Rima Maktabi
 Shyann Malone (HLN)
 Rob Marciano
 Miguel Marquez
 Roland S. Martin
 Mary Matalin
 Cami McCormick
 Kayleigh McEnany
 Robin Meade (HLN)
 Cherie Mercado
 Jim Miklaszewski
 Mary Jo Mitchell
 Tom Mintier
 Jim Moret
 Piers Morgan
 Bruce Morton
 Reynelda Muse
 Octavia Nasr
 Arthel Neville
 Lucia Newman
 Betty Nguyen
 Rachel Nichols
 Robert Novak
 Michael Nutter
 Miles O'Brien
 Soledad O'Brien
 Femi Oke
 Keith Olbermann 
 Marga Ortigas
 Kris Osborn
 Christina Park 
 Kathleen Parker
 Christi Paul (CNN/HLN)
 Veronica Pedrosa
 Perri Peltz
 Michaela Pereira (HLN)
 Cal Perry
 Indra Petersons
 Kyra Phillips (CNN/HLN)
 Kitty Pilgrim
 Drew Pinsky (HLN)
 Chris Plante
 Vinnie Politan (HLN)
 Elizabeth Prann (HLN)
 Bill Press
 Jennifer Psaki
 Norma Quarles
 Ash-har Quraishi
 Aneesh Raman
 JJ Ramberg
 Dallas Raines
 Anjali Rao
 Candy Reid
 Jacque Reid
 Maria Ressa
 Dan Rivers
 Chuck Roberts
 John Roberts
 Thomas Roberts 
 Susan Roesgen
 Dan Ronan
 Susan Rook
 Lynne Russell (HLN)
 Brent Sadler
 Zoraida Sambolin
 Rick Sanchez
 Rick Santorum
 Robin Sax (HLN)
 Andreas van der Schaaf
 Bill Schneider
 Suzanne Sena (HLN)
 Isha Sesay
 Frank Sesno
 Bella Shaw
 Bernard Shaw
 Mark Shields
 Daniel Schorr
 Lynn Smith (HLN)
 Kate Snow
 Tony Snow
 Linden Soles
 Martin Soong
 Jim Spellman (CNN/HLN)
 Eliot Spitzer
 Barbara Starr (CNN/CNN International)
 Brian Stelter — Reliable Sources''
 Linda Stouffer (HLN)
 Kathleen Sullivan
 Fionnuala Sweeney
 Lisa Sylvester
 Manisha Tank (CNN International)
 Jonathan Tasini
 Abbi Tatton
 Felicia Taylor
 Owen Thomas
 Andrea Thompson
 Mary Tillotson
 Jeffrey Toobin (CNN senior legal analyst)
 Nischelle Turner
 J. D. Vance (CNN)
 Bob Van Dillen (HLN)
 Alphonso Van Marsh
 Greta Van Susteren
 Stuart Varney
 Hannah Vaughan Jones (CNN International)
 Lyn Vaughn
 Jane Velez-Mitchell (HLN)
 Luis Carlos Vélez
 Amelyn Veloso
 Ali Velshi
 Alessio Vinci
 Dave Walker
 Michael Ware
 Margaret Warner
 Lou Waters
 Bernard Watson
 Bob Weaver
 Rafer Weigel
 Jennifer Westhoven (HLN)
 Harris Whitbeck
 Liz Wickersham
 Beverly Williams
 Mary Alice Williams
 Gerri Willis
 Reynolds Wolf
 Jack Womack
 Judy Woodruff
 Nick Wrenn
 Van Earl Wright
 Andrew Yang (CNN)
 Jessica Yellin
 Paula Zahn
 John Zarrella
 Charles Zewe

References

 
CNN anchors